Qañawimayu (Quechua qañawi, qañiwa, qañawa a cereal from the family Chenopodiaceae, mayu river, "qañawi river", hispanicized spelling Cañahuymayo) which upstream is called Cayacti and downstream successively is named Jaraucata, Qullpa (Collpa), Yawina (Yavina) and Santo Tomás River is a river in Peru. It is  located in the Apurímac Region, Cotabambas Province, and in the Cusco Region, Chumbivilcas Province and Paruro Province. It belongs to the Apurímac watershed.

At first its direction is to the north. South of the mountain Wamanripa it turns to the northeast. It receives waters from the confluence with Sinqa Wayq'u. Near the town of Santo Tomás it turns to the north again. The confluence with the Apurímac River is at a mountain named Tinkuq (Tincoc) on the border of the districts of Tambobamba, Ccapi and Huanoquite.

References

Rivers of Peru
Rivers of Apurímac Region
Rivers of Cusco Region